The 2013–14 CEV Challenge Cup was the 34th edition of the European Challenge Cup volleyball club tournament, the former CEV Cup.

Turkish club Fenerbahçe Grundig beat Italian Andreoli Latina in the final and achieved their first CEV Challenge Cup trophy. Serbian opposite Ivan Miljković was the Most Valuable Player of the final tournament.

Participating teams

Qualification phase

1st round
1st leg 19–20 October 2013
2nd leg 26–27 October 2013

|}

2nd round
1st leg  5–7 November 2013
2nd leg 26–28 November 2013

|}

Main phase

16th finals
1st leg 10–12 December 2013
2nd leg 17–19 December 2013

|}

8th finals
1st leg 14–15 January 2014
2nd leg 21–23 January 2014

|}

4th finals
1st leg  4– 5 February 2014
2nd leg 12–13 February 2014

|}

Final phase

Semi-finals

|}

First leg

|}

Second leg

|}

Final

First leg

|}

Second leg

|}

Final standing

References

External links
 Official site

CEV Challenge Cup
2013 in volleyball
2014 in volleyball